A Reeb graph (named after Georges Reeb by René Thom) is a mathematical object reflecting the evolution of the level sets of a real-valued function on a manifold.
According to  a similar concept was introduced by G.M. Adelson-Velskii and A.S. Kronrod and applied to analysis of Hilbert's thirteenth problem.
This general principle was first used to study neutral surfaces in oceanography.

Reeb graphs have also found a wide variety of applications in computational geometry and computer graphics, including computer aided geometric design, topology-based shape matching, topological data analysis, topological simplification and cleaning, surface segmentation  and parametrization, efficient computation of level sets, neuroscience, and geometrical thermodynamics.
In a special case of a function on a flat space (technically a simply connected domain), the Reeb graph forms a polytree and is also called a contour tree.

Level set graphs help statistical inference related to estimating probability density functions and regression functions, and they can be used in cluster analysis and function optimization, among other things.

Formal definition 

Given a topological space X and a continuous function f: X → R, define an equivalence relation ∼ on X where p∼q whenever p and q belong to the same connected component of a single level set f−1(c) for some real c. The Reeb graph is the quotient space X /∼ endowed with the quotient topology.

Description for Morse functions 

If f is a Morse function with distinct critical values, the Reeb graph can be described more explicitly. Its nodes, or vertices, correspond to the critical level sets f−1(c). The pattern in which the arcs, or edges, meet at the nodes/vertices reflects the change in topology of the level set f−1(t) as t passes through the critical value c. For example, if c is a minimum or a maximum of f, a component is created or destroyed; consequently, an arc originates or terminates at the corresponding node, which has degree 1. If c is a saddle point of index 1 and two components of f−1(t) merge at t = c as t increases, the corresponding vertex of the Reeb graph has degree 3 and looks like the letter "Y"; the same reasoning applies if the index of c is dim X−1 and a component of f−1(c) splits into two.

References 

Graph families
Application-specific graphs